Pittstown can refer to:

Pittstown, New Jersey
Pittstown, New York